The 2010–11 season is the 32nd season of Kitchee SC in Hong Kong First Division League. The team is coached by Spain coach Josep Gombau.

Key events

Squad statistics

Statistics accurate as of match played 16 September 2010

Matches

Competitive

Hong Kong First Division League

Hong Kong Senior Challenge Shield

Singapore Cup

Quarter-final

References

Kitchee
Kitchee SC seasons